Paradryomyza is a genus of flies from the family Dryomyzidae. There are 4 known species.

Distribution
For a small geneus they are widespread, living in the Indomalayan (P. orientalis, P. steyskali), Palearctic (P. setosa) and Nearctic (P. setosa, P. spinigera) realms.

Species
P. orientalis Ozerov & Sueyoshi, 2002 
P. setosa (Bigot, 1886) 
P. spinigera Ozerov, 1987 
P. steyskali Ozerov & Sueyoshi, 2002

References

Dryomyzidae
Sciomyzoidea genera